Benjamin Franklin Medal may refer to:

Benjamin Franklin Medal (American Philosophical Society)
Benjamin Franklin Medal (Franklin Institute)
Benjamin Franklin Medal (Royal Society of Arts)
Benjamin Franklin Award (Bioinformatics)

See also
 Franklin Medal, awarded by the Franklin Institute 1915–1997
 IBPA Benjamin Franklin Awards, of the Independent Book Publishers Association